The Kylling Bridge is a railway bridge in Rauma Municipality in Møre og Romsdal county, Norway. The bridge crosses the Rauma River near the village of Verma in the upper part of the Romsdalen valley. The bridge is part of a double horseshoe curve that allows the railway to pass a narrow and steep section of the valley. It is one of the most photographed railway bridges in Norway.

The construction of the Kylling Bridge started in September 1913. After almost 9 years, the bridge was finally finished in the winter of 1921. The Rauma Line railway opened on 29 November 1924.  The Kylling Bridge cost .

References

Bridges completed in 1921
Railway bridges in Møre og Romsdal
Bridges on the Rauma Line
Rauma, Norway
1921 establishments in Norway